Viejas Arena (formerly Cox Arena) is the home arena of the San Diego State Aztecs men's and women's basketball teams. It is located on the San Diego State University (SDSU) campus in San Diego, California. Viejas Arena opened in July 1997 and seats 12,414 for basketball and up to 12,845 for concerts. The facility also hosts SDSU's commencement ceremonies.

History 
Viejas Arena was built on the site of the old Aztec Bowl football stadium (a Works Progress Administration project) on the SDSU campus, and the university (or its affiliated corporation) still owns the arena. It was originally named Cox Arena after Cox Communications, which owns one of the local cable television systems in the greater San Diego regional area, and which paid fees to become the arena's corporate sponsor. The arena was renamed to Viejas Arena under a 10-year naming rights agreement announced March 17, 2009. On October 29, 2015, the basketball court was named Steve Fisher Court after men's basketball head coach Steve Fisher.

Events 
The stadium has hosted numerous sporting events such as the men's NCAA basketball tournament first and second rounds in 2001, 2006, 2014, 2018, and 2022. In the 2006 tournament, the first-round games were delayed and the building evacuated due to a bomb-sniffing dog picking up scents of a potentially dangerous substance. These fears were unfounded, however, and play went on as scheduled. Because of its status as SDSU's home court, the Aztecs were not allowed to open the tournament at home (under "pod system" rules). In 2007, the arena was the home of the San Diego Shockwave indoor football team for one season.

In addition to sports, Viejas Arena has also hosted television events such as WCW's Bash at the Beach in 1998 and some episodes of WCW Monday Nitro. The arena hosted TNA Wrestling's Bound For Glory pay-per-view event on October 20, 2013. They were also the host of filming Megadeth's live DVD Blood in the Water: Live in San Diego.

Viejas Arena is also used as a large concert venue where major musical acts perform. The arena is often used as an alternative to the much larger Pechanga Arena across town. Lady Gaga performed at the stadium on her ArtRave: The Artpop Ball tour on June 2, 2014. On June 11, 2019, it became the first arena to host Dude Perfect's live show, "Pound It, Noggin Tour". Veijas was also the arena where Dude Perfect filmed the footage used for their documentary, Dude Perfect Backstage Pass.

Gallery

See also
 San Diego State Aztecs
 Aztec Bowl
 Viejas Casino
 List of NCAA Division I basketball arenas

References

External links
 Viejas Arena - official page
 Page on goaztecs.com

1997 establishments in California
Basketball venues in California
College basketball venues in the United States
Indoor arenas in California
Music venues in California
San Diego State Aztecs basketball venues
Sports venues completed in 1997
Sports venues in San Diego